Pa'l Mundo Tour is the first world tour by the reggaeton duo Wisin & Yandel to promote their fifth studio album Pa'l Mundo. It consisted of two legs in Latin America and United States. This tour included their first presentation at the Coliseo de Puerto Rico and it marked the first time that a reggateon act sold out two consecutive nights at the venue. Also, their presentation in Radio City Music Hall in New York and Altos de Chavon in Dominican Republic, marked the first time that a reggaeton act performed at those venues. Both concerts were reported sold out.

More shows were planned, however they were cancelled due to Wisin's illness in July 2006 and others for unknown reasons. Also, the tour marked their first presentation as a headliner artist in most of the cities in Latin America. The two concerts in Bolivia reported a total attendance of 55,000.

Tour dates

Notes

Cancelled Concerts

References 

2006 concert tours